Benito Zadi Zokou (born 17 September 2000) is an Ivorian professional footballer who plays for CO Korhogo.

References

External links 
 
 

2000 births
Living people
Ivorian footballers
Ivorian expatriate footballers
Expatriate footballers in Belarus
Association football defenders
FC Smorgon players
SC Gagnoa players
CO Korhogo players